A bicycle bomb (or bike bomb) is an improvised explosive device that is placed on a bicycle.

History

United Kingdom

 The IRA used bicycle bombs twice in Northern Ireland and once at a British military facility in Germany.
 On 25 August 1939 an IRA bicycle bomb exploded in Coventry, killing five people. The bomb had been left in the basket of a bicycle.
 In 1979 a bomb exploded in package carried in a mailbag on a postman's bicycle in Streatley, Berkshire.
 13 August 1994 Two bombs were planted in bags placed on bicycles in Brighton and Bognor Regis. The Bognor one detonated damaging shops but no casualties, the Brighton one was defused.
 No information is available on the bomb detonated at a British military installation in Germany.
 On 8 August 1976, a member of the Parachute Regiment, Private Robert (Bob) Borucki, was killed by the explosion of a bomb planted inside a basket of a bicycle at Crossmaglen. Borucki is buried in the cemetery in the village of Wales, near Rotherham. A year later, a sangar named after the soldier was built on the spot. The facility was removed in the early 2000s as part of the Belfast Agreement.

Sri Lanka

 On 30 August 2001 a time bomb tied to a bicycle exploded in the coastal town Kalmunai, killing two policemen and a bystander.

Pakistan

 A bicycle bomb exploded in a suburb of Quetta on 24 May 2004, wounding 15 police and militiamen traveling in a police truck.

Afghanistan

 In Kandahar in the main square at least 15 people were wounded by a bicycle bomb.
 In February 2006 in the city of Kunduz as a result of a bicycle bomb two Afghans were killed and a German Bundeswehr soldier (from ISAF) was injured.
 In Kabul on 10 October 2006, a bicycle bomb exploded near a police bus, wounding 11 police officers and civilians.

Germany

 In 1989, Alfred Herrhausen, chairman of Deutsche Bank, was killed by a sophisticated bomb hidden in a parked bicycle.

Iraq

 In the Iraqi city of Baqubah according to the police at least 25 people were killed in a bicycle bombing on 26 June 2006.
 August 2009, a bicycle bomb explodes near a restaurant in Baghdad killing two people.

India

 In the Indian city of Jaipur a series of seven bomb blasts took place within a span of twelve minutes on 13 May 2008, killing at least 90 people and injuring hundreds more.
 In Ahmedabad, largest city of the state of Gujarat, 45 were killed in a series of 17 blasts which took place within 1 hour on the evening of July 28, 2008.
Twin bomb blasts at Dilsukhnagar ( Hyderabad )on Feb 21st,2013, 18 Killed and 40 Injured.

Russia
On August 21, 2009, in Grozny, Chechnya, alleged suicide bombers approached police checkpoints on bicycles before blowing themselves up, killing and wounding several people.

Jugoslavia Apocryphal - requires confirmation

 Sarajevo 1948, bomb in frame of bike exploded sending saddle out for seat tube for several hundred feet, bike reported otherwise still rideable.

Gaza
On 19 May 2003 a 19 year-old Hamas militant strapped explosives to the back of his bicycle in the Gaza Strip and rode it alongside an Israeli Army vehicle, detonating it, killing himself and injuring 3 Israeli soldiers.

Spain
On 28 June 2001, a parcel bomb planted by the ETA on a bicycle exploded in Madrid, injuring at least 10 people.

In popular culture
The 1955 novel The Quiet American by Graham Greene describes the use of bicycle bombs in Saigon.
The movie Charlie Wilson's War mentions the need for bicycle bombs in the Afghanistan resistance of the USSR.
There is a band called This Bike is a Pipe Bomb, and bicycles bearing the band's stickers have caused false evacuations at airports and universities.

References

External links 
Afghan bicycle bomb injures 15 - CNN - December 6 2003
Bicycle Bomb Kills Locals, Injures German Soldier - Deutsche Welle - February 22 2006
Bicycle bomb near police bus injures 11 in Kabul - CBC News - October 10 2006
Bicycle bombs and the fourth policeman John Adams explores the lack of evidence for existence of pipe bombs disguised as bicycles.

Terrorism tactics
Bombs
Suicide weapons
Improvised explosive devices